The Torture Museum, Amsterdam is a museum in Amsterdam, located near the Bloemenmarkt overlooking the Singel. It exhibits historical instruments of torture.

The museum has been noted as "one of the world's most unusual museums." The museum is very popular among tourists. 

The Torture Museum Amsterdam is not to be confused with a similar museum showcasing instruments of torture in Amsterdam, the Museum of Medieval Torture Instruments. The two museums are not connected.

Museum layout 

The museum consists of narrow and dimly lit rooms. Each room features one or two torture devices, which visitors are allowed to touch and interact with. Each device is accompanied with an enlarged image from an old book or article featuring that device in use and a description of that device and how and why it was used. All of the articles are translated into English, Dutch, French, German, Italian, and Spanish.

Articles on display 

The museum features a variety of devices, from well-known objects such as the guillotine, the rack and the stocks, to lesser-known objects like thumb screws and the flute of shame. Other objects housed in the museum include the iron maiden, skull crusher, Judas cradle, Catherine wheels, and Scold's bridle. Some of the devices are genuine and antique, but many are modern reconstructions.

Significance 

The museum, whilst small, has a large influence. The museum regularly appears in lists of 'top weird museums' and is regularly visited and cited in regards to the museum's extensive range of torture devices. Several books use the Torture Museum as a source.

References

External links 
http://www.torturemuseum.com/
http://www.torturemuseum.nl/

Museums in Amsterdam